Ömer Karaevli (born 11 September 1977, in Ankara) is a Turkish show jumping rider.

Personal life
Karaevli is the son of Ahmet Karaevli, a politician of the  Motherland Party (ANAP) and Minister of State in the Özal cabinet (1983–1987).

Karaevli lives in Nettetal, Germany with his Dutch spouse Roos, daughter Leyla and son Omer.

Sport career
Karaevli performed equestrian sport at Ankara Atlıspor Club before he moved to Europe. Currently, he runs his own stable "Stal Karaevli" in Swolgen, Netherlands.

He earned a quota spot for 2016 Summer Olympics to represent Turkey with his Belgian Warmblood horse "Dadjak Ter Puttenen". He will be the first Turkish equestrian to participate at the Olympics since 56 years.

References

External links
 

1977 births
Sportspeople from Ankara
Turkish show jumping riders
Turkish male equestrians
Living people
Olympic equestrians of Turkey
Equestrians at the 2016 Summer Olympics